A total solar eclipse occurred on May 18, 1901. A solar eclipse occurs when the Moon passes between Earth and the Sun, thereby totally or partly obscuring the image of the Sun for a viewer on Earth. A total solar eclipse occurs when the Moon's apparent diameter is larger than the Sun's, blocking all direct sunlight, turning day into darkness. Totality occurs in a narrow path across Earth's surface, with the partial solar eclipse visible over a surrounding region thousands of kilometres wide.
The path of totality crossed French Madagascar (the part now belonging to Madagascar), Réunion, British Mauritius (now Mauritius), Dutch East Indies (now Indonesia), and British New Guinea (now belonging to Papua New Guinea).

Related eclipses

Solar eclipses 1901–1902

Saros 136

Inex series

Notes

References

 Photo of Solar Corona May 18, 1901
 Eclipse of May 18, 1901 (Sumatra). Contact print from the original glass plate negative. Lick Observatory Plate Archive, Mt. Hamilton.
 Total Eclipse of the Sun, May 18, 1901 Reports on the Dutch Expedition to Karang Sago, Sumatra, by Dr. A. A. Nijland, March 1903, Utrecht, Published by the Eclipse Committee of the Royal Academy, Amsterdam
 Russia expedition for solar eclipse of May 18, 1901

1901 05 18
1901 in science
1901 05 18
May 1901 events